Orthotylus flavinervis  is a Palearctic species, commonly found on alder and sycamore. Their upper surface is covered in dense and pale hairs, and their wing membrane is observed to be dusky, with yellow veins throughout.

References
 

Orthotylus
Hemiptera of Europe
Insects described in 1856